Himalayan WhiteHouse International College (HWH) is a Liberal Arts college established in 2001 at New Baneshwor, Kathmandu, Nepal

Sports 
Himalayan WhiteHouse's Department of Sports organizes various sporting competitions and tournaments both within and outside campus.

HWH has partnered with Nepal Sports Management (NCM), to help students make careers in cricket and futsal. .

Amenities 
HWH's Learning Research Center has an  IT center with wifi and back-up power, and has laboratories for physics, chemistry, botany, zoology, a training kitchen and restaurant, and a library with over 20,000 books, reference materials, and periodicals. In addition to the Learning Research Center, HWH also has a canteen and auditorium.

References

Universities and colleges in Nepal
2001 establishments in Nepal